Myanmar competed at the 2013 Southeast Asian Games. The 27th Southeast Asian Games took place in Naypyidaw, the capital of Myanmar, as well as in two other main cities, Yangon and Mandalay.

Medals

Medal table

Medals by date

Controversies

Alleged racial discrimination
 About a day before the games began, the Burmese authorities deselected two Chin athletes who were gold medallists in national events. Another Chin athlete was also deselected a month previously.

References

Nations at the 2013 Southeast Asian Games
2013 in Burmese sport
2013